Adaptive reuse refers to the process of reusing an existing building for a purpose other than which it was originally built or designed for. It is also known as recycling and conversion. Adaptive reuse is an effective strategy for optimizing the operational and commercial performance of built assets. Adaptive reuse of buildings can be an attractive alternative to new construction in terms of sustainability and a circular economy. It has prevented thousands of buildings' demolition and has allowed them to become critical components of urban regeneration. Not every old building can qualify for adaptive reuse. Architects, developers, builders and entrepreneurs who wish to become involved in rejuvenating and reconstructing a building must first make sure that the finished product will serve the need of the market, that it will be completely useful for its new purpose, and that it will be competitively priced.

Definition 
Adaptive Reuse is defined as the aesthetic process that adapts buildings for new uses while retaining their historic features. Using an adaptive reuse model can prolong a building's life, from cradle-to-grave, by retaining all or most of the building system, including the structure, the shell and even the interior materials. This type of revitalization is not restricted to buildings of historic significance and can be a strategy adopted in case of obsolete buildings.

Some urban planners see adaptive reuse as an effective way of reducing urban sprawl and environmental impact. Revitalizing the existing built fabric by finding a new use or purpose for obsolete buildings can be a wonderful resource to a community by "keeping neighborhoods occupied and vital".

According to Yung and Chan, "adaptive reuse is a new kind of maintainable rebirth of city, as it covers the building’s lifetime and evades destruction waste, encourages recycles of the embodied dynamism and also delivers substantial social and economic profits to the world".

Benefits and Challenges of Adaptive Reuse 
Benefits: Typically categorised under economic, social, cultural and historical, and environmental benefits. The most significant benefits of adaptive reuse of existing buildings include increased economic opportunities, urban regeneration, preserved cultural and historical heritage values, reduced landfill demolition waste, increased energy efficiency, extended building usefulness, and cost-effectiveness, enhanced property value, improved life quality, reduced carbon emissions, and lesser energy consumption.

Challenges: Typically categorised under building regulatory requirements and governance, financial, management, and complexities and uncertainties challenges. The most significant challenges of adaptive reuse of existing buildings include structural integrity issues, compliance with building code regulations, government anti-adaptive reuse policies, lack of awareness, high maintenance cost, uncertainties surrounding existing building information, lack of incentives, and lack of decision-making tools and stakeholder participation.

Adaptive Reuse and Built Heritage Preservation 
A majority of historical buildings provide physical links and the progression of cultural evidence to the past. In a fast-growing urbanizing world, these heritage values viewed as public goods could aid the significance of a town's cultural heritage and unique competitiveness. Heritage preservation charters mandate that when historical buildings with heritage values are being redeveloped, their architectural and heritage character should be maintained and conserved for sustainability. Accordingly, this mandate on heritage preservation has led to the scheduling of several heritage buildings into district plans, thereby protecting them from unsympathetic alterations or demolition through regulations. Built heritage conservation through adaptive reuse could therefore be used to promote sustainable historical and cultural development of urban areas. Parameters to prioritise historical buildings for adaptive reuse and the characterisation of adaptive reuse stakeholders are also noted.

Adaptive Reuse and Urban Regeneration 
The reuse of older vacant buildings for other purposes forms a very important aspect of any urban regeneration scheme. The adaptation process implies selecting relevant novel technologies and design concepts that will support the older buildings to adjust successfully to contemporary requirements without destroying the existing urban form. Adopting the adaptive reuse approach for the redevelopment of older vacant buildings provides added benefits to the regeneration of an urban area in a sustainable way, through transforming these buildings into usable and accessible units. The adaptive reuse strategy would also enable the local authority and owners of older vacant buildings in urban areas to minimize their economic, social and environmental costs, in a quest for a continued urban expansion and development.

Adaptive Reuse and Climate Change 
The current climate change reality requires integrating the global sustainability challenge of conserving natural resources for future generations with improving resilience and adaptive capacity within the built environment. The adaptive reuse of existing buildings can be adopted to facilitate climate change mitigation progressively.  explored the applicability of the adaptive reuse concept as a sustainable tool for climate change mitigation.

Adaptive Reuse Stakeholders 
In an adaptive reuse decision-making setting, there is usually an occurrence of conflicting beliefs, opinions, interests, and resources among relevant stakeholders. Knowing who these stakeholders are and why, through a collaborative approach, will allow stakeholders with diverse interests regarding adaptive reuse to come together and participate either directly or indirectly in any stage of the decision-making process. There are four typical categories of stakeholders involved in an adaptive reuse decision-making process: i) investors; ii) producers; iii) regulators; and iv) users.

Adaptive Reuse Decision-Making Framework and Validation 
Identification of Parameters:  identified parameters for the development of a performance-based framework, to prioritise the most suitable historical building options for adaptive reuse intervention from a list of underutilised buildings. 

Framework Validation:  balanced the diverse interests of all stakeholders in the adaptive reuse decision-making process.

Advantages of adaptive reuse 
According to Zaitzevsky and Bunnell, old buildings physically link us to our past and become a part of our cultural heritage; they should be preserved because of their "architectural beauty" and the "character and scale they add to the built environment". Retention and rehabilitation of existing buildings also reduces the consumption of building materials, resources, energy and water needed for new construction.

Cost savings on building material: Adaptive reuse involves the refurbishment of existing building members, which is labor-intensive process and relies less on purchasing and installing many new building materials. Cost of building materials has risen sharply over the past few decades, while the cost of labor has increased only marginally compared to that of building materials. Therefore, it is economically viable to renovate and reuse an existing building.
Cost savings on demolition: Demolition costs can run as high as 5% to 10% of the total cost of new construction. This expense is often overlooked by many building owners. Some urban areas have strict building safety regulations and may not allow the usage of a swinging ball and other more efficient demolition techniques. Under these circumstances, buildings must be demolished piece by piece, which can be quite expensive and time-consuming.
Saves time; faster than brand new construction: The total time required to renovate an existing building is generally less than the time required to construct a comparable amount of floor space in an entirely new building. A major advantage of renovating an existing building is that a refurbished portion of the building becomes suitable for occupancy before completion of the whole project. This provides as a huge advantage for private developers as it keeps the cash inflow during while the rest of the project undergoes construction.
Tax advantages: Tax provisions in several states and municipalities across the United States, provide incentives for rehabilitating historic structures.
Availability of Federal, State and local funds: The United States' National Historic Preservation Act of 1966 established matching grants-in-aid, obtained through state historic preservation offices, that can be used for the acquisition and restoration of properties listed in the National Register of Historic Places. Similarly, community development block grants provided to municipalities by the U.S. Department of Housing and Urban Development are a major source of funds for neighborhood preservation projects.
Decreased public and social costs: As these heritage settlements have been getting crowded in the past decades, people have been looking for farther lands for development. This rapid urbanization and urban sprawl cause several harms to our planet and the society. Lack of adaptive reuse of existing built assets, on a societal level, has caused disturbance due to dislocation of residents, economic decline and disruption of community life, eventually leading to abandoned and obsolete neighborhoods.
Conserves energy: Old buildings represent an investment of energy and labor made at a time when costs were significantly lower. Demolition of these buildings requires new expenditures of energy to generate new building materials and to assemble them on a cleared site. Additionally, modern building systems have high life-cycle costs and operational energy costs associated with them whereas traditional masonry and stone buildings are more climate responsive. An environmental benefit of reusing built assets is identified to be the retention of the original buildings "embodied energy". According to Schultmann and Sunke, "new buildings have much higher embodied energy than those that are adaptively reused". Reddy and Jagadish support this statement by saying that "the reuse of building materials can provide substantial savings in embodied energy that would otherwise be wasted".

Factors affecting adaptive reuse
Building owners, architects, developers and other stakeholders undergo an in-depth process of decision making before determining whether a building should be conserved and remodeled for a different use or just demolished for the land it sits on, then develop a new building on that land. These decisions are governed by the following criteria:

Economic considerations
The decision to reuse or demolish built assets is driven by economic considerations such as development costs, project costs, investment returns and market. The economic costs differ from project to project and some professionals go as far as to assert that "new build is always more economical" and "renovation is universally more expensive"[1] due to their own involvement with adaptive reuse projects. Others claim that the return on investment is enhanced when using an older building because of the savings involved. One Canadian developer claims that reusing buildings generally represents a saving of between 10-12%[2] over building new. In terms of profitability, there are also assertions that adaptive reuse projects often have an uncertainty to their profitably that newer developments lack. When looking for funding to build, these considerations must be addressed.

Capital investment 
In a survey conducted by Bullen and Love, it was observed that building owners and operators were most concerned about a multitude of financial considerations, while deciding whether to reuse their built assets. These include development and construction costs, marketing and maintenance costs. Most adaptive reuse projects depend on their economic feasibility determined by the building's existing physical configuration and condition. According to Bullen and Love, the adaptive reuse decision making was fundamentally driven by a "desire for short-term profits". However, most of the survey respondents were rarely concerned about the sustainability and environmental concerns associated with adaptive reuse decision making. Nevertheless, many of these developers were aware of the positive impact that building reuse and sustainability can have on their corporate image.

Building owners are concerned with the life expectancy of built assets, their energy and environmental performance and the high operating costs which may appear due to poor mechanical equipment, services, building materials and construction. Developers saw a thorough potential in saving groundwork and excavation costs by using an adaptive reuse model for their property. Additionally, they thought that "in Central Business District locations, built assets are an attractive investment option for reuse projects, as premium prices and rents can be obtained for an office space". Best rents can be obtained only when these remodeled buildings hold "high-quality finishes" and have high Energy Star rating appliances. Building owners also considered the commercial performance of buildings in terms of "tenant needs, investment returns, maintenance, repair costs, operational costs, productivity levels, employee retention rates, aesthetics of building and its market value".

Building stakeholders often marketed their reused built assets centered around "epoch and utility" and "character and ambiance". Some end users were more attracted to modern architecture while others were more into the adaptive reuse style. This varying perception of a building's form, function and style depended on the occupant age group.

Asset condition 
Sometimes, built assets cannot be considered suitable for adaptive reuse, simply because of the nature of their built form or the condition that they are in. For example, one cannot make the most out of a highly compartmentalized, single use building such as a prison. Mid 1900s low-rise apartments that have low floor area ratios (FAR) and which may be in some of the cities' prime locations cannot be considered profitable for adaptive reuse. In such scenarios, it would be more profitable for the developers to demolish and replace the existing building with a high-rise that has more space to sell. Often, when building owners cannot find an obvious use for a building, it is left to degenerate and decay and eventually collapse. This may pose as a threat to the safety of the neighborhood. Decaying buildings may even be subject to vandalism and become spaces for anti-social activities and may have a negative impact on the value of the properties in their vicinity.

Bullen and Love's survey respondents thought that "the benefits of reusing their existing facility could include avoiding the disruption of relocation, reducing maintenance and running costs". A reuse project should not compromise on satisfying user needs. The survey respondents suggested that a cost vs benefits analysis is essential to determine the return on investment of an adaptive reuse project. The most important governing factors of adaptive reuse decision making with respect to asset condition were observed to be the building's structural integrity, its residual service life, its spatial layout, its location and the ease of retrofitting or installing new building components to the existing built form. According to Bullen and Love, the buildings of the 1960s and 1970s in Perth were badly constructed, used ineffective thermal insulation materials and details and have low suitability for adaptive reuse. On the other hand, the built form of the 1980s was deemed to be engineered to specifications and could accommodate an adaptive reuse model.

The survey respondents expressed several concerns and risks that could arise during and after the adaptive reuse of a building which included finding tenants, the threat of building not meeting the demand of the end users, lack of structural stability and structure and material decay during the reconstruction phase of the project.

Regulations 
In Bullen and Love's survey, many respondents thought that there was not enough support and incentives from the government for carrying out adaptive reuse of built assets. They felt that there is limited flexibility in the building codes, limited plot ratio bonuses and an overall "lack of encouragement" by state and local governments to implement innovative adaptive reuse designs. Suggested solutions from some survey respondents include establishing a mandate to only lease buildings that have undergone adaptive reuse with a high Energy Star rating. Some of the architects thought that there was a high dependency and credit given to energy and green building rating systems such as the "Green Star Environment Rating System" but not enough credit was given to the improvements carried out during adaptive reuse and its sustainable outcomes such as the recycling of building materials, reduced energy and water consumption and reduced environmental impacts like global warming potential, lake eutrophication potential and ozone layer depletion. One architect thought that "undertaking exemplar adaptive reuse demonstration projects for industry professionals to assess and emulate would display a commitment to sustainability and urban regeneration". However, this solution has several harmful implications and forcing an adaptive reuse directive on to the industry and its clients was deemed to be heavy handed and could be counterproductive. The existing building codes and regulations for fire safety and building access to disabled make it difficult to work around the adaptive reuse of old constructed buildings.

Social considerations 
In this civilized world, buildings have become the core of a society. Cities and communities grow organically around important buildings followed by the commercial development of those neighborhoods. These buildings and the development around them soon become the heart of a community upon which people's life depends. Therefore, regular maintenance and reuse of existing structures can help communities avoid the trauma caused by dilapidation, abandonment and clearance.

As these heritage settlements have been getting crowded in the past decades, people have been looking for farther lands for development. This rapid urbanization and urban sprawl cause several harms to our planet and the society. Lack of adaptive reuse of existing built assets, on a societal level, has caused disturbance due to dislocation of residents, economic decline and disruption of community life, eventually leading to abandoned and obsolete neighborhoods.

Old buildings are often found in fully developed neighborhoods where public amenities like sewers, water lines, roads, etc. have already been established. Adaptive reuse means that the stakeholders of the built asset are relieving governments and municipalities off the load of having to supply these public amenities on distant plots.

In a survey conducted by researcher Sheila Conejos, several architects, developers and building stakeholders were asked about their opinion on the social implications of adaptive reuse of existing buildings. It was observed that most respondents thought that adaptive reuse is important to the society because old buildings are critical to the image and history of a society. They agreed that historical buildings add to the aesthetics of a townscape and should be preserved and reused.

Environmental considerations 
Buildings consume high amounts of energy during their life-cycle. New construction requires new building materials and other resources which possess high embodied energy (throughout their extraction, manufacture, transportation, packaging and assembly phases). Additionally, they also cause high environmental damage such as global warming, eutrophication, ocean acidification, ozone layer depletion, carbon emission which in turn harms human health and quality of life. From this standpoint, there are several environmental benefits associated with building recycling or adaptive reuse.

Water efficiency 
Water is an important component in building construction. Water is needed at every stage of a building's life, from building material extraction to manufacture, on-site construction processes such as concrete mixing, cleaning, etc., operational phase in the form of plumbing for human use and landscaping and fire safety, and at the end of its life for recycling building materials or disposing them. Selecting adaptive reuse over brand new construction can help relieve the planet of such water loads.

Energy conservation 
Just as water is needed in every stage of a building's life, so is energy. This energy is conventionally obtained from non-renewable sources and causes high carbon emission. Minimizing fossil fuel depletion and carbon emission can be huge contributing factors to reducing global warming and mitigating climate change. Choosing to demolish an existing built asset and then constructing a brand-new building in its place can lead to high energy requirement for the demolition, building material waste management, new material procurement, construction and operation. On the other hand, sustainably retrofitting an existing built asset only requires a fraction of this energy. It is important to keep in mind that many of the old building may not have the best of operational energy use efficiency. Therefore, to achieve a successful adaptive reuse project, the designers must keep the building's energy use intensity at utmost importance.

Materials and resources 
Building materials are generally procured from the Earth's strata or are end products of processed natural components. These resources are limited. Irresponsible extraction of natural compounds for building material manufacture can deplete these natural compounds from the earth. Moreover, extraction can cause harm to the natural habitat and biodiversity of the region where materials are extracted. Therefore, a project that uses minimum new building material and uses more of recycled materials is a more sustainable and responsible choice for a building material.

Adaptive reuse potential 
According to Chusid's "urban ore" concept, existing buildings that are fast approaching dilapidation or disuse are a "mine of raw materials for new projects". Shen and Langston built upon this idea and said that "an even more effective solution than raw material recovery is adaptive reuse". They studied that "a huge focus on economic factors alone has led to the destruction of buildings well short of their physical lives". Shen and Langston developed an integrated model for the assessment of adaptive reuse potential by comparing case studies of one urban and one non-urban setting. The basis of this model lies in that "opportunity rises and falls within the confines of a negative exponential decay function linked to a building’s physical life expectancy". According to their study, a building reaches its maximum potential for adaptive reuse at a point when the building's age and its useful life merge or meet. At this point, the building's adaptive reuse potential is either an upward curve or a downward curve which can determine whether the potential is high, medium or low.

The adaptive reuse potential calculator establishes a "predicted useful life" of a building by considering a series of physical, economic, functional, technological, social, legal and political characteristics. These characteristics are used to derive an "annual obsolescence rate" and "environmental obsolescence". These outcomes are necessary to determine an optimum point at which adaptive reuse intervention should occur.

Obsolescence is advanced as a suitable concept to objectively reduce the expected physical life of a building to its expected useful life. A discounting philosophy is adopted, whereby the annual obsolescence rate across all criteria is the "discount rate" that performs this transformation. An algorithm based on a standard decay (negative exponential) curve produces an index of reuse potential (known as the ARP score) and is expressed as a percentage. This decay curve in buildings can be used to establish an ARP score, which is expressed in percentage. Cities can rank their existing buildings as per their adaptive reuse potential and this data can be used by government authorities at any point in time. An adaptive reuse score of 50% or above is considered high. A low ARP score is anything below 20%. Anything between that range is considered moderate. Shen and Langston devised this concept of ARP as "rising from zero to its maximum score at the point of its useful life, and then falling back to zero as it approaches physical life". When the "current building age" is identified to be close to or end of its useful life, is the right time for builders to commence redesign.

Methodology of adaptive reuse 
Buildings have a high impact on the environment, the economy and our society. Adaptive reuse has several benefits to mitigate those high impacts. Adaptive reuse projects are, in many ways, different from conventional new construction projects and must be planned and managed differently.

Building condition assessment 
Before starting an adaptive reuse project and even considering refurbishment, it is important that the condition of the existing building is thoroughly assessed. A condition assessment primarily inspects a building's structural integrity, roofing, masonry, plaster, wood-work, tiling and the mechanical, electrical and plumbing systems. The in-depth inspection of buildings can be expensive. Nevertheless, building condition assessment is critical to the success of an adaptive reuse project and must not be avoided at any cost because this expense is insignificant relative to the injury or loss of life that a building failure might cause. One logical reason, as explained by the American Society of Civil Engineers, is that even a very well constructed building could undergo serious deterioration and eventually failure, if proper maintenance is not performed in the operational phase of the building. For example, in the year 1984, the New York City Passenger Ship Terminal went through a thorough inspection and was identified with extreme corrosion in its exterior steel columns (100% of web loss and 40% of flange loss). This condition posed a threat to the public safety and had to undergo immediate restriction of live load in spite of additional bracing of critical bents. Such inspections conclude with the preparation of a detailed report summarizing the findings of the investigation. The direct inspection of the structural system is required to a certain degree which is decided by the judgement of an experienced civil engineer.

Survey of neighborhoods 
After identifying the stability and soundness of a building, it is important to survey the neighborhood to find the potential use and function of the adaptive reuse project for that segment of the market or region that the building owners wish to attract. In many cases, an adaptive reuse project might help stabilize a neighborhood which may be otherwise decaying or be at a threat of vandalism. This upward trend may create lucrative rent opportunities for building owners and dwellers of the neighborhood. This survey can be in the form of a physical inspection of the neighborhood and/or a detailed study of the zoning map of that region. Pedestrian activity, presence of sidewalks, street lights, benches and public parks and the presence of well-occupied shops and buildings can tell us a lot about neighborhoods. After the neighborhood has been established to be stable and safe and free of any infringing decay, the next step is to determine what amenities it has to offer in terms of roadways, public transportation, shopping and eating, hospitals, schools and libraries and so on.

Financial considerations 
As discussed previously, adaptive reuse projects have the potential to work in phases or parts. A major advantage of renovating an existing building is that a refurbished portion of the building becomes suitable for occupancy before completion of the whole project. This provides as a huge advantage for private developers as it keeps the cash inflow during while the rest of the project undergoes construction. Keeping in mind the conclusions from structural and architectural survey, neighborhood survey and marketing survey, a budget is prepared. Building owners or developers can approach any of the financing sources such as insurance companies, foundations and funds, savings banks, building loan societies, endowment funds, Real Estate Investment Trusts, etc.

Architect’s contract 
In most adaptive reuse projects, it is the architect who is the leader with the imagination of how an abandoned warehouse can become an office building or an abandoned hospital a condominium. Since the architect has a deep involvement in the success of a project, he must perform his work under a clearly defined contract. Under this contract, the architect and the owner are under the obligation of the contract and must abide by it. Progress of design, site visits and evaluation are some of the basic actions that the architect performs under this contract. There are different types of contracts, ranging from a fixed fee contract, percentage of construction cost contract and fee plus expenses contract. All stakeholders may collectively decide on the most suitable type of contract for the project.

Detailed study of structure 
Before the architect and engineer begin the final designing for the building, they make a thorough structural, mechanical and architectural survey of the existing building.

Foundation and basement 
The architect and engineer may look for signs of cracking of masonry wall or the settling of basement floors or upper floors which direct them to a problem in the foundation. These signs can also be detected from window sills and cornices. Appropriate survey instruments such as plumb bobs and spirit levels are recommended for use instead of a naked eye inspection. If the problem seems too severe, a test boring may reveal the cause of the problem. Additionally, the building code should be examined for fireproofing requirements.

Structural system 
Analyzing the structural strength requires expertise and is one of the most crucial in terms of occupant safety. On-site inspection along with a study of existing floor plans can help engineers determine the structural stability. In some case, when the building drawings may not be available, engineers may have to scrape off the plaster to reveal the underlying structure. Wooden members of the structural system should be especially checked for rot or termite infestation. Iron or steel must be checked for corrosion and loose bearings or bolting. Additional future dead and live loads must be kept in mind while designing with the structural strength of the existing building.

Floor system 
The floor system in old buildings is usually strong enough to satisfy present codes. If not, additional supporting members may be necessary. The floor and ceiling height should be able to accommodate additional stairways, vertical plumbing, electrical and HVAC. In some cases, an elevator may have to be installed.

Exterior walls 
The building envelope should be examined thoroughly for cracks, watertightness (infiltration or leaks) and mortar joints. It is important to examine these exterior walls for future fenestration and air conditioning ducts.

Mechanical and electrical equipment 
Buildings undergoing adaptive reuse often lack modern and energy efficient MEP systems and appliances.

Heating: Determining the capacity of the heating plant for the new building use and occupancy. Existing heating systems involving boilers and burners and metal piping could be salvaged for recycling.

Ventilation: Office and commercial buildings require ventilation. Toilets and kitchens also need ventilation. The floor height must be able to accommodate fan equipment. If the existing building consists some duct work, it should be tested for obstructions, deterioration and air leakage.

Air conditioning: Air conditioning ducting and equipment can be expensive and demand a lot of ceiling space. These economical implications must be considered for the new use of the building before deciding the installation of an air conditioning system.

Plumbing: Old buildings used galvanized iron pipes for plumbing which may be subject to serious deterioration over the years. Proper connection to municipal sewers must be evaluated and fixed if broken.

Electrical: While the electrical wiring may still be intact, the panel boards, junction boxes and electrical feeders may not be as per the present day fire codes. Additionally, the switch boards may be outdated and have to be replaced. The architect and engineers must also determine of additional transformer vaults and feeder lines are necessary.

Roof and waterproofing 
Older building roofing systems generally comprise the roof, parapets and cornices. Projecting metal cornices are subject to corrosion. Parapets may be subject to cracks and degrading mortar joints. A careful examination of the top-floor ceiling may reveal water leakage.

Stairways and exits 
The stairway requirement for a building should be derived from present-day building codes for fire and safety. Strategic placement of new staircases and layout for maximum access should be done in order to maximize space utility and minimize the burden on the structural system.

Designing to save energy 
Redesigning the existing building for new use must accommodate energy conservation strategies. Some of the most important methods of energy conservation are, reducing heating and cooling loads through building envelopes, maximizing natural ventilation potential, using daylighting and energy efficient lighting fixtures and so on.

Building envelope 
A building's envelope protects it from the external weather conditions. To prevent the extreme climate of the exterior from causing discomfort to occupants, buildings use mechanical heating and cooling systems. If the building envelope is not designed well, the heating and cooling loads on the mechanical equipment might go high. Therefore, for maximum energy efficiency, building envelopes should be the first layer to block out external weather conditions, then the load on the equipment can be minimized. This can be achieved by using a combination of exterior wall materials to form a high resistance wall assembly.

Windows and doors 
The fenestration in an external wall assembly are the biggest wasters of energy. They waste heat by conduction, radiation and infiltration. This can be controlled to an extent by using multiple layered glazing systems and using low-e coatings on the glass. Additionally, it is important to seal the window and door systems to avoid infiltration. Similarly, in hot and sunny climates, it is important to shade windows to avoid heat gain due to solar radiation.

Roof 
An exposed roof is the greatest source of heat loss during cold months and heat gains during hot months. Therefore, roof insulation becomes very crucial in extreme climate conditions. Another passive technique is to separate living spaces from roof by adding dead buffer spaces such as attics under the roof.

Floor 
The only floor that need be considered is the bottom floor. It may be a slab on grade or built over a crawl space. In these cases, insulation should be considered. If the perimeter of a slab on grade is insulated from the weather, this is all that can be hoped for. Over a cold crawl space, a two-in blanket under the floor will cut the heat loss by at least 50%. A concrete floor slab can be insulated by sprayed-on insulating material.

Disassembly sequence planning 
Building owners and developers can take the potential advantage of adaptive reuse by taking away components from unused buildings and then repair, reuse or recycle its constituent parts. Disassembly is a form of recovering target products and plays a key role to maximize the efficiency of an adaptive reuse project. This disassembly planning sequence aims to reduce the environmental impacts caused due to demolition using a "rule-base recursive analysis system" with practical and viable solutions.

By location

Americas

Canada
As a comparatively young country, adaptive reuse is not the norm in Canada, where redevelopment has typically meant demolition and building anew. Calgary and Edmonton are particularly known for their pro-demolition culture, but they are not unique in this regard. However, since the 1990s, adaptive use has gained traction. The conversion of former railway-centred warehouse districts to residential and commercial uses has occurred in Edmonton, Calgary, Saskatoon, Regina, and Winnipeg.

In Toronto, the Distillery District, a neighbourhood in the city's southeast side, was entirely adapted from the old Gooderham & Worts distillery. Other prominent re-uses include the Candy Factory on Queen Street West and the Toy Factory, in the city's Liberty Village district, both designed by Quadrangle Architects, a firm specializing in adaptive re-use in Toronto and elsewhere. Vancouver's Yaletown, an upscale neighbourhood established in the 1990s, features warehouses and other small-industrial structures and spaces converted into apartments and offices for the gentrification of the area. Vancouver's Granville Island also demonstrates a successful mix of adaptive reuse as well as retention of traditional uses in the same district. Montreal's Griffintown, Old Port, and Lachine Canal areas all feature ex-industrial areas that have been reused or will do so in the future on current plans.

Other noted adaptive reuse projects in the 2010s have included the Laurentian School of Architecture in Sudbury, which is incorporating several historic buildings in the city's downtown core into its new campus, similar to the downtown campus of NSCAD University in Halifax, and Mill Square in Sault Ste. Marie, an ongoing project to convert the derelict St. Mary's Paper mill into a mixed-use cultural and tourism hub.

A number of former military bases in Canada, declared surplus in the 1990s, have also proven to be opportune for adaptive reuse. An example is the former CFB Cornwallis in rural Nova Scotia which was largely converted, without demolitions, into a business park.

United States

Ghirardelli Square in San Francisco was the first major adaptive reuse project in the United States, opening in 1964. Urban waterfronts, historically used as points for industrial production and transport, became popular as residences and mixed use. The greatest value of the adaptive use movement is characterized by the hundreds of abandoned schools, factories, hotels, warehouses and military posts that have been adapted for use as affordable housing, office buildings, as well as commercial, civic, educational and recreational centers.

A large number of brick mill buildings in the Northeast United States have undergone mill conversion projects. In the United States, especially in the Northeast and Midwest, loft housing is one prominent result of adaptive reuse projects. Formerly-industrial areas such as the Meatpacking District in New York City, Callowhill in Philadelphia and SoMa in San Francisco are being transformed into residential neighborhoods through this process. This transformation is sometimes associated with gentrification. Station Square in Pittsburgh Pennsylvania is an example of a mile-long former Pittsburgh and Lake Erie Railroad terminal and headquarters being converted into a retail, office, hotel, and tourist destination. The Pratt Street Power Plant in Baltimore was converted to offices, retail, and restaurants. An example of adaptive reuse conversion to office space are The Hilliard Mills. The adaptive reuse of Empire Stores will transform seven abandoned coffee warehouse in Brooklyn Bridge Park in New York City into office, retail, restaurant and a rooftop public park.

Other museums adapted from old factories include "MassMOCA", the Massachusetts Museum of Contemporary Art, the Watermill Center in Long Island, New York, and The Dia Art Foundation Museum in upstate New York.

In San Diego, California, the historic brick structure of the Western Metal Supply Co. building was preserved and incorporated into the design of Petco Park, the ballpark of the San Diego Padres.

Chapman University in the city of Orange, California has created student housing by converting the Villa Park Orchards Association Packing House, which was built in 1918 for the Santiago Orange Growers Association. The student housing complex opened in August 2018.

Throughout the United States until the 1970s, the vast majority of gas stations also offered mechanical work. Converting the service bays into a convenience store in the 1980s and 1990s was common while still selling fuel. Many others stopped selling fuel and became shops or offices.

Australia

In Australia, there have been a number of adaptive reuse projects as the main cities have turned from industrial areas into areas of high value and business areas. In Sydney, sites such as the old Sydney Mint have been renovated and adapted into inner-city headquarters for the Historic Houses Trust of New South Wales. The movement of the city from an industrial, working class area into a gentrified area with high house prices has helped a number of adaptive reuse sites to exist within such an area, the old Hyde Park Barracks building has also been transformed from an old jail into a museum which documents and records the history of Australia's first settlers and convicts.

The industrial history of Australia has also been an influencing factor in determining the types of buildings and areas which have gone on to become adaptive reuse sites, especially in the realms of private residences and community based buildings. Some such sites include, Nonda Katsalidis’ Malthouse apartments in Richmond, a conversion of a former grain silo and the South Australian site of the Balhannah Mines which was adapted into a private residence and has received awards from the Housing Industry Association and the Design Institute of Australia.

In Adelaide four prominent, heritage listed 19th Century buildings in poor repair were restored, refurbished and given new roles by the South Australian Government during the Rann Government (2002 to 2011). The Torrens Building in Victoria Square, former headquarters of the Registrar-General, was restored and adapted to become the Australian campus for both Carnegie Mellon University and University College London. The former Adelaide Stock Exchange building was purchased, restored and adapted to become the Science Exchange for the Royal Institution Australia and the Australian Science Media Centre. The Torrens Parade Ground and building were restored for use as a headquarters for veterans' organisations. Nearly $50 million was committed to restore and adapt the large Glenside Psychiatric Hospital and precinct as the new Adelaide Studios of the South Australian Film Corporation opened by Premier Rann in October 2011. And the 62 hectare former Mitsubishi Motors plant is being adapted to become a clean manufacturing centre and education and training hub for Flinders University and TAFE.

Europe

In Europe, the main forms of adaptive reuse have been around former palaces and unused residences of the different European royal families into publicly accessible galleries and museums. Many of the spaces have been restored with period finishes and display different collections of art, and design. In Paris, France, the most famous example of adaptive reuse is the Musée du Louvre, a former palace built in the late 12th century under Philip II and opened to the public as a museum in 1793. Also, in London, England, the Queen's House, a former royal residence built around 1614, has become part of the National Maritime Museum and houses the museum's fine art collection.

The Tate Modern, also in London, is another example of adaptive reuse in Europe. Unlike other adaptive reuse galleries in Europe, however, the Tate Modern takes full advantage of the site of the former Bankside Power Station, which involved the refurbishment of the old, abandoned power station. The wide industrial space has proven to be a worthy backdrop to modern art, with the famous turbine hall hosting artworks by artists including Olafur Eliasson, Rachel Whiteread and Ai Weiwei.

Other famous adaptive reuse sites in Europe include the Maastricht branch of the Selexyz chain in the Netherlands. This project received 2007 Lensvelt de Architect interior design award for its innovative reuse and is number one on The Guardian'''s worldwide top ten bookstores list.

In Łódź, Poland, the Izrael Poznański mills have been turned into the  Manufaktura mixed-use development, including a mall, 3 museums, multi-cinema and restaurants.

 Asia 

 Hong Kong 
 
The Hong Kong government launched the Revitalising Historic Buildings Through Partnership Scheme in 2008.  One of the buildings in this scheme is former public housing Mei Ho House, which was converted to a hostel managed by Hong Kong Youth Hostels Association.

 Taiwan 
In Taichung, Dawn Cake bought the former ophthalmology hospital and converted it into a restaurant. 

 Types of adaptive reuse interventions 
 Historic preservation
 Renovation
 Facades
 Integration
 Infrastructure reuse

See also

 Architectural conservation
 Conservation-restoration of cultural heritage
 Facadism
 Historic preservation
 Mill conversion
 World Heritage Sites
 How Buildings Learn''

Notes

External links and further reading
Rhode Island School of Design –  graduate program on adaptive reuse
On Adaptive Reuse A blog, mostly architectural, but it also treats adaptive reuse as an approach to a wide range issues. 
"Adaptive Re-Use of Brownfields: A Challenge for the Valuation," John A. Kilpatrick
Adaptive Reuse Photo Gallery  Adaptive reuse building example and photo gallery (Evanston, Illinois)
Pettinari, J. 1980, 'Adaptive Reuse: A Case Study', Journal of Interior Design and Research, Vol. 6, No. 2, pp. 33–42
Bullen, P., Love, P. 2011, 'Factors influencing the adaptive re-use of buildings', Journal of Engineering, Design and Technology Vol. 9 No. 1, pp. 32–46
 Letzter, Jonathan (2022). Additions to historic buildings: between parasite and prosthetic, Journal of Architectural Conservation Architecture:"Additions to historic buildings: between parasite and prosthetic architecture"
 Letzter, Jonathan (2022). Addition to historic building: A hermeneutic interpretation, Cogent Arts & Humanities, Volume 9, 2022 - Issue 1: "Addition to historic building: A hermeneutic interpretation"
Building
Urban planning
Repurposing